Antiplanes catalinae is a species of sea snail, a marine gastropod mollusk in the family Pseudomelatomidae.

Description
The length of the shell attains 27 mm, its diameter 7.6 mm.

(Original description) The sinistral shell is thin, elongated and slender. It contains 10-11 whorls. Its color is light, pinkish -brown, without bands. The interior of the aperture is a little lighter: The upper whorls are more or less chalky. The protoconch is smooth and inflated. The later whorls are convex. The suture is deeply impressed. The shell is sculptured by fine incremental lines and on the last whorls a few obscure, spiral striations, mostly below the periphery. The anal fascicle is traceable on the spire as a flattened or obscurely grooved band. The aperture is narrow. The siphonal canal is wide and short. The columella is nearly straight, with a well-defined callus, obliquely truncate below. The outer lip is produced and deeply emarginate near the sutural margin of the whorl.

Distribution

References

 McLean J.H. (1996). The Prosobranchia. In: Taxonomic Atlas of the Benthic Fauna of the Santa Maria Basin and Western Santa Barbara Channel. The Mollusca Part 2 – The Gastropoda. Santa Barbara Museum of Natural History. volume 9: 1–160

External links
 
 

catalinae
Gastropods described in 1904